Wilbert is an unincorporated community in Tenhassen Township, Martin County, Minnesota, United States.

Notes

Unincorporated communities in Martin County, Minnesota
Unincorporated communities in Minnesota